, also known as Metal Angel Marie, is a Japanese manga series written and illustrated by Sakura Takeuchi. It was serialized in Shueisha's seinen manga magazine Weekly Young Jump from 1994 to 1997. A three-episode original video animation (OVA) was animated by Pierrot and released in 1996. The OVA was licensed for English release in North America by ADV Films.

Story
Hiroshi Karigari, a college student, is shy and awkward with humans, but a genius in robotics.  He has a crush on certain other student named Marie.  Utterly failing to communicate his feelings to her, he creates an android almost exactly like her, close enough to pass for her twin, and names her Marie. But though he programmed her to be the perfect wife, she turns out to be quite different. Then Marie accidentally meets the original Marie, and Hiroshi starts telling people that he and Marie are siblings as a cover story. Soon, a tough girl, Hibiki, enters the picture, and threatens to reveal the truth about Marie, unless Hiroshi becomes her boyfriend.

Media

Manga
Written and illustrated by Sakura Takeuchi, My Dear Marie was serialized in Shueisha's seinen manga magazine Weekly Young Jump from 1994 to 1997. Its chapters were collected in ten tankōbon volumes released from July 24, 1994, to July 23, 1997.

Original video animation
A three-episode original video animation (OVA) animated by Pierrot was released from March 6 to August 21, 1996. The OVA was licensed for English release in North America by ADV Films and released on VHS, in Japanese with English subtitles, in 1998. ADV Films released an English dub on VHS, with the series re-titled as Metal Angel Marie, in 1999. It was later released on DVD, with the original title My Dear Marie, on September 28, 2004. The OVA was licensed in Australia and New Zealand by Madman Entertainment.

Episode list

Reception
Keith Rhee of EX commented that the series' comedy is the "main selling point of the show", comparing as well the series to Masami Yuki's Assemble Insert, and concluded: "If you are into lighthearted shows with plenty of wacky antics in general, MY DEAR MARIE is definitely worth a shot." Carlos Ross of THEM Anime Reviews also praised the OVA, highlighting its "stunning animation, unique character designs", and story, calling it "alternately hilarious and really touching". Ross stated: "My Dear Marie is an adorable little romance story where you don't expect to find one, and it's definitely on my list of tapes to buy in the near future."

Chris Beveridge of AnimeOnDVD called the characters and story "sweet", praising as well the animation, character designs and overall artwork, adding: "It's very easy to like the characters here and it's a rarity to actually like the male lead but My Dear Marie pulls it off successfully." In a negative review, Bamboo Dong of Anime News Network wrote: "Visually, it's hideous. Story-wise, it's awful. Emotionally, it's insulting", criticizing as well the randomness of its plot, concluding: "Maybe to old school anime fans, this will bring back some fond memories of when they watched this crap on VHS, but welcome to The Present. It's a beautiful land where you don't have to settle for junk like this anymore. Do you like romance, comedy, drama, science fiction, and heart-tugging emotions? You'll find none of that here."

References

Further reading

External links
 

1994 manga
1996 anime OVAs
ADV Films
Pierrot (company)
Romantic comedy anime and manga
Science fiction anime and manga
Seinen manga
Shueisha franchises
Shueisha manga